Gnophos obfuscata, the Scotch annulet or Scottish annulet, is a moth of the family Geometridae. The species was first described by Michael Denis and Ignaz Schiffermüller in 1775. It is found in northern, central, and southeastern Europe, Scotland, Ireland, and the Iberian Peninsula.

The ground colour is uniform brownish grey, but this is variable and dependent on habitat. The forewing has a discal stain. The pattern consists of vague white spots and transverse lines.

Adults are on wing in July and August.

The larvae feed on various plants found in heath areas, such as Calluna vulgaris and Saxifraga species.

Subspecies
Gnophos obfuscata obfuscata
Gnophos obfuscata androgynus Reisser, 1936
Gnophos obfuscata marsicaria Dannehl, 1933
Gnophos obfuscata nivea Schawerda, 1913

References

External links

Scotch annulet at UKMoths
Moths and Butterflies of Europe and North Africa

Ennominae
Moths of Europe
Taxa named by Michael Denis
Taxa named by Ignaz Schiffermüller